Edward Saul Steinfeld (born 1966) is a political scientist and academic specializing in contemporary Chinese politics. He is currently Director of the Watson Institute for International and Public Affairs and Professor of Political Science at Brown University. Steinfeld moved to Brown in 2013, having previously taught at the Massachusetts Institute of Technology.

Steinfeld received a Bachelor of Arts, Master of Arts, and doctorate from Harvard University. He currently serves on the board of directors of the National Committee on United States–China Relations.

In 2015, Steinfeld was appointed the Howard R. Swearer Director of Brown University's Watson Institute for International and Public Affairs. He was reappointed in December 2020.

Books

References

External links 

 Mao’s Lesson for Trump’s America

Living people
Harvard College alumni
Harvard University alumni
Massachusetts Institute of Technology faculty
Brown University faculty
1966 births